The Four Winds hat (in Northern Sami čiehgahpir) is one version of traditional man's hat of the Sami. The basis is a simple blue cylinder, decorated with a band with braid patterns, but the top is a large, four-cornered star, colored bright blue with parts bright red and yellow. The decoration in an actual Sami hat is, like the rest of the Sami garb, indicative of the person's place of origin or even his clan or marital status, much like the Scottish tartan.

Description
The hat is four-cornered to represent the four corners of the earth, which the early Sámi believed to be square. Traditionally, the hat was blue to represent the sky and had white, yellow, or red trim. The corners were stuffed with down for warmth and to allow the hat to keep its shape. Small items could also be stored in the corners of the hat.

History

The hat was originally based on a Russian pattern learned in contact with Russians on the coast of the Barents Sea, but the top was exaggerated and the hat decorated with the traditional bright-colored embroidery to produce the Four Winds hat.

Today, the hat is a common souvenir for visitor to the Laplands, which scholar Maaria Niskala cites as an example of how Sáminess is othered in promotional tourism materials.

References

Sámi clothing
Headgear
Hats